The flag, that serves as the symbol of the city of Koszalin, West Pomeranian Voivodeship, in north-western Poland, is divided horizontally into two equally-sized stripes, white on the top, and blue on the bottom. It was established in 1959.

Design 
The flag of the city of Koszalin is divided is divided horizontally into two equally-sized stripes, white on the top, and blue on the bottom. The flag proportions have the aspect ratio of its height to its width equal 5:8.

History 
The flag was established by the City Council on 10 February 1959, making it one of the oldest city flags of Poland. Originally, the flag proportions were not specified, but later, they were set at 5:8.

References 

Koszalin
Koszalin
Koszalin
1959 establishments in Poland